Neojeffreya is a genus of Malagasy flowering plants in the family Asteraceae.

Species
There is only one known species, Neojeffreya decurrens, native to Madagascar.

References

Monotypic Asteraceae genera
Inuleae
Endemic flora of Madagascar
Taxa named by Ángel Lulio Cabrera